Joey Benin or Joey B is a Filipino bassist, singer, producer and musical arranger. He is best known as a former member of the band Side A and as songwriter for the hit song "Forevermore".

Music career
In 1986, Benin joined Side A as bass player. At the time, he was the youngest member in the band and also responsible for the song "Eva Marie". He later left Side A permanently to spend more time with his family and their business. Joey B was replaced by Ned Esguerra, former member of the band Freeverse.

As a composer, he has worked with such artists as Pido Lalimarmo, Janno Gibbs, Regine Velasquez, Martin Nievera, his own band Side A and Japanese sound/recording engineer Koji Ishikawa.

Personal life
Benin studied at UP College of Music with a Major in Guitar and Minor in Piano. He is married to Eva Marie "Bing" Ledesma-Benin; to whom the song "Eva Marie" was written for. They have four children: Boey, Jaco, Clara (of the song "Clara's Eyes") and Sarah.

After leaving Side A, Benin became a haciendero, currently tending a fish farm and develops a natural organic farmland in Silay, Negros Occidental. He also writes music for Tapulanga and Kalipay. Both foundations are helping less fortunate children find homes and get a good education.

Joey is currently one of the staff and ministers of Victory Silay.

Discography

Popular compositions and arrangements
"I Believe in Dreams" – Janno Gibbs
"Forevermore" – Side A's single won them the 1996 Awit Award for Best Performance by a Group for the third consecutive year and the Song of the Year.
"Only You" – Regine Velasquez

Movie theme song
"Munting Hiling" – Inang Yaya
"Nanay" – Inang Yaya theme song (finalist at Gabi ng Parangal Famas Awards ’07)
"Forevermore" – Forevermore
"Got to Believe in Magic" – song arrangement for the film Got 2 Believe

Awards as a songwriter and musician
Awit Award for Song of the Year 1996 – "Forevermore" 
Katha Music Award for Song of the Year 1996 – "Forevermore" 
Awit Award for Best Arrangement 1998 – "Ugoy ng Duyan"
Metro Pop 1999 – third place with "Clara's Eyes"
Awit Award for Song of the Year 1999 – "Clara's Eyes"
Awit Award for Best Arrangement 1999 – "Clara's Eyes"

References

External links

Year of birth missing (living people)
Living people
Musicians from Metro Manila
Filipino songwriters
Filipino bass guitarists
21st-century Filipino singers